Daniel F. Martin (February 1, 1865 – January 8, 1907) was an American lawyer, judge, and politician from New York.

Life 
Martin was born on February 1, 1865, in New York City to Irish immigrants. He attended the College of the City of New York.

Initially, Martin worked as a public school teacher. At one point, he was Professor of Mathematics at St. Francis Xavier College. While teaching, he began to study law. He attended Columbia Law School. After he was admitted to the bar, he became a clerk for United States Attorney Stephen A. Walker. He later opened a law office with assemblyman Wright Holcomb.

In 1890, he was elected to the New York State Assembly as a Democrat, representing the New York County 18th District. He served in the Assembly in 1891, 1892, and 1893. In 1893, he was elected Civil Justice of the 6th District. In 1899, he was elected Municipal Court Justice of the 6th District.

Martin died at home on 245 E. 33rd St. from pneumonia on January 8, 1907. He had a wife and three children.

References

External links 
The Political Graveyard

1865 births
1907 deaths
Politicians from Manhattan
Lawyers from New York City
City College of New York alumni
Columbia Law School alumni
19th-century American politicians
Democratic Party members of the New York State Assembly
New York (state) state court judges
Deaths from pneumonia in New York (state)
19th-century American judges